Mexicanisimo is the thirteenth studio album by keyboardist Yanni, released on Venemusic label in 2010. The album peaked at #15 on Billboard's "Regional Mexican Albums" chart, at #2 on Billboard's "Top New Age Albums" chart and at #31 on "Billboard's "Top Latin Albums" chart in the same year.

Background
The album is a musical tribute to Mexico during its period of bicentennial celebrations. Yanni has collaborated with Mexican producer Manuel Cázares to interpret many Mexican songs that embrace the country's heritage. The album features performances by guest stars Lucero ("Mi Ciudad") and Pepe Aguilar ("Silverio Peréz").

Track listing

Credits
José Luis Aguilar - Harp
Alfredo Nava - Vocals
Amador Bedolla - Cello
Rubén Bedolla - Viola
Luis René Cárdenas (Boro) - Recording and mixing
Javier Carrillo - Arrangements
Iris Alejandrina Cázares - Copyist
Manuel Cazares - Arrangements
Isabel Frenk - Cello
Patricia Hernández - Viola
Jorge Jimarez - Vocals
José Manuel Jiménez - Vihuela
Julio Lizarraga - Arrangements
Luz María - Cello
Mariachi Águilas De México - Vocals
Angel Ramos - Sax (Soprano)
David Rivera - Guitarrón
Cristobal Rodales - Harp
Alfredo Solis - Vocals
Yanni - Piano, production
Manuel Cázares - Executive producer

References

External links
Official Website

2010 albums
Yanni albums